Bilal Mahmoud Najdi (born 26 November 1993) is a Lebanese footballer who plays as a midfielder for  club Nejmeh.

Club career 
A youth product of Salam Sour, Najdi played for Tadamon Sour, before moving to Chabab Ghazieh in August 2015 on a one-season contract.

In August 2016, Najdi joined Ansar from Chabab Ghazieh. He moved to Akhaa Ahli Aley on a one-season loan in August 2019. Najdi signed for Nejmeh ahead of the 2022–23 Lebanese Premier League.

International career 
Najdi was called up to the Lebanon national under-20 team squad that participated in the 2013 Jeux de la Francophonie. He played for the senior team in two friendly games, against Oman and Kuwait.

Honours 
Ansar
 Lebanese Premier League: 2020–21
 Lebanese FA Cup: 2016–17, 2020–21
 Lebanese Super Cup: 2021

References

External links
 
 
 
 
 

1993 births
Living people
People from Tyre, Lebanon
Lebanese footballers
Association football midfielders
Salam Sour SC players
Tadamon Sour SC players
Chabab Ghazieh SC players
Al Ansar FC players
Akhaa Ahli Aley FC players
Nejmeh SC players
Lebanese Premier League players
Lebanon youth international footballers
Lebanon international footballers